Skull Valley may refer to:

Valleys
 Skull Valley (Utah), a valley in Tooele County, Utah, United States
 Skull Valley Indian Reservation
 Skull Valley (Arizona), a valley in Yavapai County, Arizona, United States
 Skull Valley, Arizona, an unincorporated community in the Skull Valley

Other uses
 Skull Valley Elementary School District, public school district in Skull Valley, Arizona
 Skull Valley Elementary School, the only school in the Skull Valley Elementary School District
 Skull Valley Road, Utah State Route 196, which runs the length of the Skull Valley in Utah